Trumpeter is a Chinese company that manufactures plastic injection moulded scale model kits. Their product line consists of model ships, aircraft, cars and military ground vehicles. The company is located in Zhongshan, China, just north of Macau. All of the design and development is done at this site and production facilities on site extend to full mold making engineering using spark erosion techniques. The factory has the capacity to take production from computer design right through to packaging with some outsourcing done on things like photo etched parts. Not only are they making models for the Trumpeter label but, under license, also for a number of other brands like Hobby Boss, Mini Hobby and even Fujimi Mokei and Pit-Road.

Armor models
Trumpeter make military vehicle kits in 1/35 and 1/72 scale.

Ship models
Trumpeter plastic models of ships are produced in 1:200, 1:350, 1:500 and 1:700 scale, although 1:350 and 1:700 are dominating. Trumpeter has a cooperation with Japanese ship model manufacturer Pit-Road for kits in 1:700 scale. These kits are usually available under the Pit-Road label in Japan and under the Trumpeter label in the rest of the world.

Aircraft models

Trumpeter produces kits of airplanes in 1:350, 1:144, 1:72, 1:48, 1:32 and 1:24 scale.

References

External links
Trumpeter's Homepage

Model manufacturers of China